In mathematics, especially in algebraic geometry and the theory of complex manifolds, coherent sheaf cohomology is a technique for producing functions with specified properties. Many geometric questions can be formulated as questions about the existence of sections of line bundles or of more general coherent sheaves; such sections can be viewed as generalized functions. Cohomology provides computable tools for producing sections, or explaining why they do not exist. It also provides invariants to distinguish one algebraic variety from another.

Much of algebraic geometry and complex analytic geometry is formulated in terms of coherent sheaves and their cohomology.

Coherent sheaves

Coherent sheaves can be seen as a generalization of vector bundles. There is a notion of a coherent analytic sheaf on a complex analytic space, and an analogous notion of a coherent algebraic sheaf on a scheme. In both cases, the given space  comes with a sheaf of rings , the sheaf of holomorphic functions or regular functions, and coherent sheaves are defined as a full subcategory of the category of -modules (that is, sheaves of -modules).

Vector bundles such as the tangent bundle play a fundamental role in geometry.

Unlike vector bundles, coherent sheaves (in the analytic or algebraic case) form an abelian category, and so they are closed under operations such as taking kernels, images, and cokernels. On a scheme, the quasi-coherent sheaves are a generalization of coherent sheaves, including the locally free sheaves of infinite rank.

Sheaf cohomology
For a sheaf  of abelian groups on a topological space , the sheaf cohomology groups  for integers  are defined as the right derived functors of the functor of global sections, . For any short exact sequence of sheaves , there is a long exact sequence of cohomology groups:

If  is a sheaf of -modules on a scheme , then the cohomology groups  (defined using the underlying topological space of ) are modules over the ring  of regular functions. For example, if  is a scheme over a field , then the cohomology groups  are -vector spaces. The theory becomes powerful when  is a coherent or quasi-coherent sheaf, because of the following sequence of results.

Vanishing theorems in the affine case
Complex analysis was revolutionized by Cartan's theorems A and B in 1953. These results generalize a large body of older work about the construction of complex analytic functions with given singularities or other properties.

In 1955, Serre introduced coherent sheaves into algebraic geometry (at first over an algebraically closed field, but that restriction was removed by Grothendieck). This is related to the fact that the category of quasi-coherent sheaves on an affine scheme  is equivalent to the category of -modules, with the equivalence taking a sheaf  to the -module . In fact, affine schemes are characterized among all quasi-compact schemes by the vanishing of higher cohomology for quasi-coherent sheaves.

Čech cohomology and the cohomology of projective space

Using Čech cohomology, one can compute the cohomology of projective space with coefficients in any line bundle.

The vanishing of these cohomology groups above dimension  is a very special case of Grothendieck's vanishing theorem: for any sheaf of abelian groups  on a Noetherian topological space  of dimension ,  for all . This is especially useful for  a Noetherian scheme (for example, a variety over a field) and  a quasi-coherent sheaf.

Sheaf cohomology of plane-curves
Given a smooth projective plane curve  of degree , the sheaf cohomology  can be readily computed using a long exact sequence in cohomology. First note that for the embedding  there is the isomorphism of cohomology groups

since  is exact. This means that the short exact sequence of coherent sheaves

The sequence reads as

which can be simplified using the previous computations on projective space. Then there are the isomorphisms

which shows that  of the curve is a finite dimensional vector space of rank

.

Kunneth Theorem
There is an analogue of the Kunneth formula in coherent sheaf cohomology for products of varieties.

Computing sheaf cohomology of curves 
In , a generic section of  defines a curve , giving the ideal sequenceThen, the long exact sequence reads asgiving Since is the genus of the curve, we can use the Kunneth formula to compute its Betti numbers. This iswhich is of rankfor .

Finite-dimensionality
In the general case of a proper scheme over a field, Grothendieck proved the finiteness of cohomology by reducing to the projective case, using Chow's lemma.

The finite-dimensionality of cohomology also holds in the analogous situation of coherent analytic sheaves on any compact complex space, by a very different argument. Cartan and Serre proved finite-dimensionality in this analytic situation using a theorem of Schwartz on compact operators in Fréchet spaces. Relative versions of this result for a proper morphism were proved by Grothendieck (for locally Noetherian schemes) and by Grauert (for complex analytic spaces). When  is a point, this theorem gives the finite-dimensionality of cohomology.

The finite-dimensionality of cohomology leads to many numerical invariants for projective varieties. When  is the field of complex numbers, this agrees with the genus of the space  of complex points in its classical (Euclidean) topology. (In that case,  is a closed oriented surface.)

Serre duality

Serre duality is an analog of Poincaré duality for coherent sheaf cohomology. In this analogy, the canonical bundle  plays the role of the orientation sheaf. Serre duality for a vector bundle  on  says that the product

is a perfect pairing for every integer . In particular, the -vector spaces  and  have the same (finite) dimension. (Serre also proved Serre duality for holomorphic vector bundles on any compact complex manifold.) Grothendieck duality theory includes generalizations to any coherent sheaf and any proper morphism of schemes, although the statements become less elementary.

GAGA theorems

GAGA theorems relate algebraic varieties over the complex numbers to the corresponding analytic spaces. For a scheme X of finite type over C, there is a functor from coherent algebraic sheaves on X to coherent analytic sheaves on the associated analytic space Xan. The key GAGA theorem (by Grothendieck, generalizing Serre's theorem on the projective case) is that if X is proper over C, then this functor is an equivalence of categories. Moreover, for every coherent algebraic sheaf E on a proper scheme X over C, the natural map

of (finite-dimensional) complex vector spaces is an isomorphism for all i. (The first group here is defined using the Zariski topology, and the second using the classical (Euclidean) topology.) For example, the equivalence between algebraic and analytic coherent sheaves on projective space implies Chow's theorem that every closed analytic subspace of CPn is algebraic.

Vanishing theorems

Although Serre's vanishing theorem is useful, the inexplicitness of the number  can be a problem. The Kodaira vanishing theorem is an important explicit result.

for all . Kodaira vanishing and its generalizations are fundamental to the classification of algebraic varieties and the minimal model program. Kodaira vanishing fails over fields of positive characteristic.

Hodge theory

The Hodge theorem relates coherent sheaf cohomology to singular cohomology (or de Rham cohomology). Namely, if  is a smooth complex projective variety, then there is a canonical direct-sum decomposition of complex vector spaces:
 
for every .

Hodge theory has inspired a large body of work on the topological properties of complex algebraic varieties.

Riemann–Roch theorems

For a proper scheme X over a field k, the Euler characteristic of a coherent sheaf E on X is the integer

The Euler characteristic of a coherent sheaf E can be computed from the Chern classes of E, according to the Riemann–Roch theorem and its generalizations, the Hirzebruch–Riemann–Roch theorem and the Grothendieck–Riemann–Roch theorem. For example, if L is a line bundle on a smooth proper geometrically connected curve X over a field k, then
  
where deg(L) denotes the degree of L.

When combined with a vanishing theorem, the Riemann–Roch theorem can often be used to determine the dimension of the vector space of sections of a line bundle. Knowing that a line bundle on X has enough sections, in turn, can be used to define a map from X to projective space, perhaps a closed immersion. This approach is essential for classifying algebraic varieties.

The Riemann–Roch theorem also holds for holomorphic vector bundles on a compact complex manifold, by the Atiyah–Singer index theorem.

Growth

Dimensions of cohomology groups on a scheme of dimension n can grow up at most like a polynomial of degree n.

Let X be a projective scheme of dimension n and D a divisor on X. If  is any coherent sheaf on X then

 for every i.

For a higher cohomology of nef divisor D on X;

Applications

Given a scheme X over a field k, deformation theory studies the deformations of X to infinitesimal neighborhoods. The simplest case, concerning deformations over the ring  of dual numbers, examines whether there is a scheme XR over Spec R such that the special fiber

is isomorphic to the given X. Coherent sheaf cohomology with coefficients in the tangent sheaf  controls this class of deformations of X, provided X is smooth. Namely,

 isomorphism classes of deformations of the above type are parametrized by the first coherent cohomology ,

Notes

References

External links

Algebraic geometry
Cohomology theories
Sheaf theory
Vector bundles
Topological methods of algebraic geometry
Complex manifolds